Yer' Album is the debut studio album by American rock band James Gang. The album was released in early 1969 on the Bluesway label. This is the James Gang's only album to feature their bassist Tom Kriss. He was replaced by Dale Peters for their next album. The album is the first to feature guitarist Joe Walsh, who would later achieve success as a solo artist and with the Eagles.

Of the eleven tracks featured, three are covers — Buffalo Springfield's "Bluebird", "Lost Woman" by the Yardbirds, and "Stop" by Jerry Ragovoy and Mort Shuman, recorded a year earlier by Howard Tate, as well as a version by Al Kooper and Mike Bloomfield for the Super Session album (albeit without vocals).

In the locked groove at the end of side 1 of the LP version of the album (which is normally silent on most phonograph records), the spoken phrase "Turn me over" repeats in a loop, while the locked groove at the end of side 2 repeats the phrase "Play me again". Both phrases were spoken by Walsh. A 'producers note' in the gatefold warns listeners not to spoil these endings to friends who have turntables with automatic return. These messages are removed from CD pressings, but are included on the 8-Track & cassette tape versions.

Critical reception

Critic William Ruhlman wrote in AllMusic that "Yer' Album contained much to suggest that the James Gang, in particular its guitarist, had a great future, even if it was more an album of performances than compositions."

Track listing

Personnel
James Gang
Joe Walsh – vocals, guitars, keyboards, piano
Tom Kriss – bass guitar; vocals (tracks 10, 11) (also credited with "good vibes" and "cheek flute")
Jim Fox – drums; vocals (tracks 3, 10, 11), acoustic guitar (track 1), piano (track 4)
Bill Szymczyk – organ (track 4), tambourine (track 3), maracas (track 7), vocals (tracks (10, 11)
Jerry Ragavoy – piano (track 11)

Production
Bill Szymczyk – producer, engineer, photography 
James Gang, Bill Szymczyk, Bert de Coteaux – arrangers
Denis Minervini – assistant engineer
Henry Epstein – cover design
Ladimir Jeric – cover art

References

1969 debut albums
James Gang albums
BluesWay Records albums
Albums produced by Bill Szymczyk